The Wolseley 4/50 and similar 6/80 were Wolseley Motors' first post-war automobiles. They were put into production in 1948 and were based on the Morris Oxford MO and the Morris Six MS respectively. The 4-cylinder 4/50 used a 1476 cc  version of the 6/80 engine, while the 6/80 used a 2215 cc  straight-6 single overhead cam.

The cars featured a round Morris rear end and upright Wolseley grille and were used extensively by the police at the time – the 6/80 particularly.

These models were built at Morris's Cowley factory alongside the Oxford. They were replaced in 1953 and 1954 by the Wolseley 4/44 and 6/90.

Wolseley 4/50

The test car cost £703 including taxes.

Sales volumes were only a third those of the car's six-cylinder sibling. The car was regarded as heavy, with "good use of the excellent gear-box" being needed to maintain a respectable pace. The Wolseley 4/50 was more upmarket and expensive than the Morris Oxford MO. The engine used was a 4-cylinder version of the 6/80. The pistons and doors were of very few common parts used in this range of cars. The snub-nose styling distinguishes it from the long elegant bonnet of the 6/80 re.

Wolseley 6/80

To accommodate its larger six-cylinder engine, the 6/80 was  longer than the 4/50. It also had larger brakes with  drums compared with the  ones of the 4/50.

The test car cost £767 including taxes. An Autocar magazine road test of an apparently similar car managed a top speed of only  and slightly slower acceleration on a windy day a couple of years earlier. The testers noted that "in keeping with [the manufacturer's] policy which has much to commend it to a discerning motorist, the Wolseley is quite high geared", which made for relaxed cruising at (by the standards of the time) speed, but a more urgent driving style involved extensive use of the gearbox. Standard equipment included a heater, a rear window blind and "twin roof lamps in the rear compartment".

A second-hand car review published in England in 1960 observed that "even the most junior member of the family" would recognise the Wolseley 6/80 as the "Cops' Car" both on television, and on the streets. The car was reckoned to offer a good power-to-weight ratio in combination with steering and suspension sufficiently excellent to permit to be "thrown around without detriment to the car and with little discomfort to the occupants".

Gallery

References

External links

 Owner's club website

1950s cars
Cars introduced in 1948
Rear-wheel-drive vehicles
4 50
Sedans